"Exactly Like You" is a popular song with music written by Jimmy McHugh and lyrics by Dorothy Fields and published in 1930. The song was introduced by Harry Richman and Gertrude Lawrence in the 1930 Broadway show Lew Leslie's International Revue which also featured McHugh and Fields's "On the Sunny Side of the Street".

Other versions
 Ruth Etting (1930)
 Louis Armstrong (1930)
 Casa Loma Orchestra (1930)
 Count Basie with Jimmy Rushing on vocals
 Django Reinhardt (1937)
 Don Byas with Thelonious Monk (1941)
 Dizzy Gillespie and Stan Getz – Diz and Getz (1953)
 Erroll Garner (1954) 
 Bing Crosby - for his album Bing with a Beat (1957).
 Aretha Franklin
 Nina Simone (1959)
 Sue Raney - Songs for a Raney Day (1960)
Sam Cooke  - My Kind of Blues (1961)
 Benny Goodman with Lionel Hampton on vocals 
 The Masakowski Family, N. O. Escape 
 Dave McKenna, Live at Maybeck Recital Hall Volume 2 (1989)
 Willie Nelson
 Frank Sinatra
 Frank Stallone - Frankie & Billy with Billy May Orchestra (2002)
 Regis Philbin - When You're Smiling (2004)
 Diana Krall, From This Moment On (2006)
 Joshua Lee Turner - feat. The Gabe Terracciano Trio (2021)

References

See also
List of 1930s jazz standards

1930 songs
1930s jazz standards
Songs with music by Jimmy McHugh
Songs with lyrics by Dorothy Fields